Herkimer County Courthouse is a historic courthouse building in Herkimer, Herkimer County, New York.  It is a three-story, wood-frame structure with painted brick walls built in 1873.  It features an octagonal tower with arched openings and a mansard roof.  It was the site of the 1906 trial of Chester Gillette.

It was listed on the National Register of Historic Places in 1972.

References

External links
County Of Herkimer: Homepage: [Digital Towpath]

Courthouses on the National Register of Historic Places in New York (state)
County courthouses in New York (state)
Government buildings completed in 1873
Buildings and structures in Herkimer County, New York
National Register of Historic Places in Herkimer County, New York